The Duchess of Windsor is a 1980 biography of Wallis, Duchess of Windsor by Diana Mosley. The book was commissioned by Lord Longford and published by Sidgwick & Jackson and again by Gibson Square in 2003. In Paris, Mosley and her husband Oswald Mosley were long-term neighbours and friends of Wallis, Duchess of Windsor and Edward VIII. On 26 June 1980, she was interviewed by Russell Harty on the BBC to discuss the project. The earlier edition sold 23, 000 copies according to Mosley's biographer, Jan Dalley.

Synopsis
The American divorcée (Simpson) attracted media attention when she married Edward VIII of the United Kingdom. Due to the divisive political issue of the proposed marriage, the king was forced to abdicate the throne in order to pursue marriage with Simpson. The author (Mosley) was a confidante and neighbour of the Duchess.

Later editions
In the revised 2003 edition, Mosley addresses latest allegations of secret service reports about the Windsors' conduct during the war and the abdication.

Simpson returned to the public consciousness with the release of the biopic W.E. in 2012. Mosley's biography was re-released in 2012 and an extract was published by the Daily Express.

Contents
The book has been published in both paperback and hardback and also features several illustrations.

Acknowledgements (6)
List of Illustrations (7)
Foreword (11)
I A Young Lady from Baltimore (12)
II Navy Wife (22)
III The Little Prince (29)
IV Prince of Wales (40)
V Divorce and Re-marriage (49)
VI Ich Dien (58)
VII Mrs Simpson meets the Prince (68)
VIII The Prince in Love (74)
IX Loved by a King (85)
X Storm Clouds (96)
XI Abdication (104)
XII King into Duke (115)
XIII Marriage (125)
XIV The First Two Years (140)
XV War (150)
XVI The Bahamas (163)
XVII The Windsors in France (169)
XVIII The Brilliant Duchess (188)
XIX Old Age (198)
XX Summing Up (211)
Index (220)

References

 Mosley, Diana, The Duchess of Windsor (1st edition, Sidgwick & Jackson, 1980) reissued, London, 2003,

External links
1980 review by Patricia Beer in the London Review of Books

Books by Diana Mitford
1980 non-fiction books
2003 non-fiction books
American biographies
Sidgwick & Jackson books